Quintessence (1900–1917) was a British Thoroughbred racehorse who won the 1000 Guineas of 1903 and was unbeaten in her six races. She was owned and bred by Evelyn Edward Thomas Boscawen, 7th Viscount Falmouth. After retiring from racing she became a successful broodmare, with her son Clarissimus winning the 2000 Guineas.

Background
Quintessence was bay filly foaled in 1900 and bred by Evelyn Edward Thomas Boscawen, 7th Viscount Falmouth. She was a daughter of St. Frusquin, who won the 2000 Guineas and Eclipse Stakes in 1896. St Frusquin was also a successful sire and was Champion sire in Britain. His other progeny included St. Amant, 1000 Guineas winners Rhodora and Flair and Epsom Oaks winners Rosedrop and Mirska. Quintessence's dam, Margarine, was a daughter of 2000 Guineas winner Petrarch.

Racing career

1902: Two-year-old season
As a two-year-old Quintessence won the Biennial Stakes at Ascot. At Newmarket she won the six-furlong Exeter Stakes, with Sermon finishing second. On 1 August at Goodwood Quintessence won the Molecomb Stakes. She finished her two-year-old season unbeaten, with three wins from three starts.

1903: Three-year-old season
On 1 May 1903 she faced 12 rivals in the 1000 Guineas at Newmarket and was ridden by Herbert Randall. Baroness La Fleche started the race as the 15/8 favourite. Also near the front of the betting was Skyscraper at 9/4, Quintessence at 4/1 and Hammerkop at 100/7. At the start three fillies - Sun Rose, Guigne and Hammerkop - got tangled in the webbing. In the early stages Skyscraper, Quintessence and Baroness La Fleche led the race on the left of the track, with another group of three just behind them racing down the centre of the track. With about two furlongs left to run Quintessence just headed Skyscraper. Sun Rose made progress through the field in the latter stages of the race, recovering from her poor start, but was unable to catch Quintessence. Quintessence won by one and a half lengths from Sun Rose, with Skyscraper in third place. Dazzling finished fourth, with favourite Baroness La Fleche finishing back in sixth place. After the race a protest was put in against the poor start, by Prince Soltykoff, the owner of Sun Rose. However, the protest was lodged a minute after the 15 minutes allowed for objections so could not be entered.

She was not entered for most of the major summer and early autumn stakes races due to her chronic problems with rheumatism. The cause of this malady was thought to be due to her habit of "tearing all the clothing off in her box." In September she won the Park Hill Stakes at Doncaster (with the Epsom Oaks winner Our Lassie unplaced) and the following month she beat three rivals to easily win the Newmarket Oaks, which was worth £450. She was retired to stud at the end of the 1903 season, finishing her career unbeaten in her six races.

Stud career
Quintessence was retired to stud, where she became a successful broodmare. Her only classic winner was Clarissimus, by Radium, who was foaled in 1913 and won the 2000 Guineas in 1916. Her 1914 foal was Nonperail, a full sister to Clarissimus. She finished third in the 1000 Guineas. Her 1916 foal was Mountaineer, a bay horse by Polymelus. She died in 1917, ten days after foaling Paragon, another son of Radium. Paragon was successfully reared by a foster-mare that Lord Falmouth bought for £60 and he went on to win the City and Suburban Handicap at Epsom in 1922.

Pedigree

Note: b. = Bay, blk. = Black, br. = Brown, ch. = Chestnut

See also
List of leading Thoroughbred racehorses

References

1900 racehorse births
1917 racehorse deaths
Racehorses trained in the United Kingdom
Racehorses bred in the United Kingdom
Undefeated racehorses
Thoroughbred family 2-s
1000 Guineas winners